
Gmina Radomsko is a rural gmina (administrative district) in Radomsko County, Łódź Voivodeship, in central Poland. Its seat is the town of Radomsko, although the town is not part of the territory of the gmina.

Villages
Gmina Radomsko contains the villages and settlements of Amelin, Bobry, Brylisko, Cerkawizna, Dąbrówka, Dziepółć, Grzebień, Kietlin, Klekotowe, Klekowiec, Lipie, Okrajszów, Płoszów, Podcerkawizna, Strzałków, Szczepocice Prywatne and Szczepocice Rządowe.

Neighbouring gminas
Gmina Radomsko is bordered by the town of Radomsko and by the gminas of Dobryszyce, Gidle, Gomunice, Kobiele Wielkie, Kodrąb, Kruszyna and Ładzice.

References
Polish official population figures 2006

Radomsko
Radomsko County